John Hench (June 29, 1908 – February 5, 2004) was an American artist, designer and director at The Walt Disney Company. For 65 years, he helped design and develop various Disney attractions and theme parks.

Early life 
Hench was born on June 29, 1908, in Cedar Rapids, Iowa, and raised in Southern California. He attended the Los Angeles Art Students' League. Hench attended further art and creative schools in the United States, including the Otis College of Art and Design in Los Angeles, the San Francisco Art Institute in San Francisco, and the Chouinard Art Institute in Los Angeles.

Career 
In 1939, Hench started as a story artist in the animation department working in areas including backgrounds, layout and art direction, effects animation and special effects. Hench was respected by Walt Disney as one of the studio's most gifted artists and worked him and Salvador Dalí on the animated short Destino, a project which began in 1945 and not completed until 2003.

Afterwards, he moved to WED Enterprises (now known as Walt Disney Imagineering). In 1954, Hench was in the studio's live action department, as lead developer of the hydraulic giant squid in 20,000 Leagues Under the Sea. The film won an Academy Award for Best Special Effects in 1954. Hench was also Disney's official portrait artist of Mickey Mouse, painting the company's portraits for Mickey's 25th, 50th, 60th, 70th, and 75th birthdays.

Hench led the design for various attractions: Tomorrowland, the Adventureland buildings and walkways, New Orleans Square and the Snow White Grotto. He also designed Space Mountain, and Cinderella Castle at the Magic Kingdom and Tokyo Disneyland. He also contributed to attractions such as the Mickey Mouse Revue, Carousel of Progress and It's a Small World. Hench was often mistaken as Walt Disney, therefore, theme parks guests would often ask him for an autograph or photo.

One of Hench's most recognizable work is his design for the Olympic Torch for the 1960 Winter Olympics at Squaw Valley, California, which subsequent torches have been based on. The design is modeled after the torches of the 1948 and 1956 Olympiads. In 1990, he received the Disney Legend award, the company's highest honor, presented by then-CEO Michael Eisner. Hench remained at Walt Disney Imagineering in Glendale, California, until 2004.

Personal life 
Hench and his wife were longtime devotees of the Hindu saint Ramakrishna, were initiated by Swami Prabhavananda, and were members of the Vedanta Society of Southern California, Hench serving as the society's board president for a short time.

Death 
Hench died of heart failure on February 5, 2004, after a brief hospitalization in Burbank, California. His name tag and 65-year service award are displayed in the Imagineering building lobby, with tributes by Imagineers lining its hallways. His wife, Lowry Hench, passed 13 days later on Feb. 18, 2004.

Legacy 
The John Hench School of Animation at the University of Southern California's School of Cinematic Arts in Los Angeles, California is named in his honor. He was a major contributor to the animation school. The school motto, "Art Makes Us Human", is a quote from Hench when he visited the school to inspire students.

Selected works

Awards
Themed Entertainment Association Lifetime Achievement Award 1998 
Disney Legend (Animation & Imagineering) 1990
Academy Award Special Effects, 20,000 Leagues Under the Sea

Further reading
Ghez, Didier, Walt's People Volume 1: Talking Disney with the Artists Who Knew Him, Theme Park Press, 2005.
Hench, John, Designing Disney: Imagineering and the Art of the Show, Disney Editions, 2003 Hardback/2009 Paperback.
Kurtti, Jeff, Walt Disney's Imagineering Legends and the Genesis of the Disney Theme Park, Disney Editions, 2008.

References

External links
 Disney Legends: John Hench
Remembering John Hench by Matthew Walker
John Hench: Foundations of Magic

1908 births
2004 deaths
American animators
Artists from Cedar Rapids, Iowa
Otis College of Art and Design alumni
Disney imagineers
Walt Disney Animation Studios people